Carol Bove (born 1971) is an American artist based in New York City. She lives and works in Brooklyn.

Early life and education
Born in 1971 in Geneva, Switzerland to American parents, Bove (pronounced bo-VAY) was raised in Berkeley, California, moved to New York in the 1990s, and graduated from New York University in 2000. She was an artist-in-residence at Yale University Art Gallery in 2010, where she pursued research on the history of architecture on the Yale campus and the effect of changing tastes in painting conservation on the Gallery's collection.

Between 2009 and 2013, she was a clinical associate professor of studio art in Steinhardt’s Department of Art and Art Professions at NYU.

Work

Using a wide range of materials, including steel, concrete, books, driftwood, peacock feathers, seashells, and foam, Bove’s diverse practice encompasses sculpture, installation, and drawing. Her oeuvre plays with questions of materiality, re-presenting and updating historical strategies of display. As the art historian Johanna Burton notes, "Bove brings things together not to nudge associative impulses into free play driven by the unconscious, but rather to conjure a kind of affective tangle that disrupts any singular, historical narrative."

Bove is perhaps best known for her large-scale sculptures, which she has described as "big, heavy, but fragile." Her sculptures are often displayed outside or in public spaces. For example, the steel and petrified wood sculpture Lingam was installed in City Hall Park in New York as part of the 2016 summer group exhibition, The Language of Things, while Bove’s 2013 show, Caterpillar, featured seven large-scale sculptures specifically created for the High Line at the Rail Yards in New York.

Earlier works by Bove range in form and medium from ink drawings of nude women taken from vintage Playboy magazines to sculptures composed of curated bookshelves featuring volumes from the 1960s and 70s. In past exhibitions, Bove has also included the work of other artists in her installations. In a 2007 show at Maccarone, she presented work by the artist Bruce Conner, Berkeley book dealer Philip Smith, and painter Wilfred Lang. Similarly, Bove designed her 2014 installation, Setting for A. Pomodoro, which features a baroque assemblage of driftwood, peacock feathers, pedestals, and bases, as a setting for a sculpture by the Italian Modernist Arnaldo Pomodoro. Every time the installation has been exhibited, it has featured a different Pomodoro sculpture.

In 2016, after working from a studio in Red Hook, Brooklyn for many years, Bove moved her practice to a former brick factory near the Brooklyn waterfront.

Exhibitions
Since she started exhibiting in the late 1990s, Bove’s work has been the subject of several solo exhibitions, including The Museum of Modern Art, New York; The Common Guild, Glasgow (both 2013); Palais de Tokyo, Paris (2010); Horticultural Society of New York (2009); Blanton Museum of Art, Austin, Texas (2006); Kunsthalle Zürich; Institute of Contemporary Art Boston (both 2004); and the Kunstverein Hamburg (2003). In 2017, Bove represented Switzerland at the 57th Venice Biennale. Other major group exhibitions include Documenta 13, Kassel, Germany (2012); the 54th Venice Biennale (2011); and the Whitney Biennial, Whitney Museum of American Art, New York (2008).

Bove's sculptures were part of the High Line Show Caterpillar, one of the last opportunities to see the undeveloped High Line.

In 2021, the Nasher Sculpture Center's exhibition titled "Carol Bove: Collage Sculptures" became Bove's first major museum exhibition focusing solely on her steel sculptures. The Curator of the show, Dr. Catherine Craft remarked: “The materials, processes, and syntax of Bove’s nascent sculptures seemed profoundly familiar to me, but there were, thrillingly, elements of the unknown, as if this long-familiar approach to sculpture could lead into places not yet imagined.”

Collections
Work by the artist is represented in permanent collections worldwide, including the Whitney Museum of American Art, New York; Fonds Régional d’Art Contemporain (FRAC) Nord-Pas de Calais, Dunkerque, France; Colección Jumex, Mexico City; the Institute of Contemporary Art, Boston; the Solomon R. Guggenheim Museum, New York; The Museum of Modern Art, New York; the Princeton University Art Museum, New Jersey; the Wadsworth Atheneum Museum of Art, Hartford, Connecticut; and the Yale University Art Gallery, New Haven, Connecticut.

References

External links
"5 Triumphant National Pavilions at the Venice Biennale, From Finnish Robots to Canadian Floods" by Lorena Muñoz-Alonso, artnet.com, May 2017
"Sculpture's Woman of Steel, Carol Bove" by Randy Kennedy, The New York Times, November 2016
"In the Studio with Carol Bove, The Sculptor Who Bends Steel as if It Were Plastic" by Stephanie Eckardt, W Magazine, November 2016
"Carol Bove's Seductive Sculptures Force Us to Confront Our Inner Animal" by Adrian Searle, The Guardian, April 2015
"Carol Bove Interview" by Freire Barnes, Time Out London, April 2015
"At Home in Two Places: Carol Bove's Sculpture Show at the High Line and MoMA" by Karen Rosenberg, The New York Times, July 2013
"Carol Bove" by Brian Sholis, Art in America, May 2012
"Carol Bove and Janine Lariviere: The Horticultural Society of New York" by Lisa Turvey, Artforum, October 2009
"Carol Bove: The Personality of Peacock Feathers" by Ann Landi, ARTnews, September 2008
"Best of 2007: Carol Bove, Maccarone" by David Rimanelli, Artforum, December 2007 
"Shelf Life: Barry Schwabsky on the Art of Carol Bove" Artforum, January 2005
"Artists on the Verge of a Breakthrough" New York Metro, March 7, 2005
Momentum 1/Carol Bove at ICA Nonstarving Artists, June 4, 2004
"Experiment in Total Freedom includes a variety of works" by Martha Schwendener, Artforum, October 2003.

Living people
1971 births
American women installation artists
Modern artists
American installation artists
Steinhardt School of Culture, Education, and Human Development alumni
20th-century American women artists
21st-century American women artists
20th-century American artists
21st-century American artists
Artists from Berkeley, California
New York University alumni